Mai Châu is a rural district of Hòa Bình province in the Northwest region of Vietnam. The district is located at about 135 km from Hanoi. The scenery of Mai Châu attracts many tourists.

In 2003, the district had a population of 48,570. The district covers an area of 520 km². The district capital is the city of Mai Châu.

Geographical features
Mai Châu is a mountainous region located in Hòa Bình Province, approximately 135 km from Hanoi and 65 km from Hòa Bình.
The east of Mai Châu borders Đà Bắc and Tân Lạc districts, the west and the south border Quan Hóa district of Thanh Hóa province, and the north borders Vân Hồ district of Sơn La province. Mai Châu's terrain is quite complex, divided by slits, streams and high mountains.
According to the topographic characteristics, Mai Châu can be divided into two distinct areas: the low region (relatively flat terrain with fertile soil) and the high region (with many high and rugged mountain ranges).

Cultural overview

The Ban Lac people have Thai ancestors that settled in northwestern Vietnam. 
The two tribes, White Thai and Black Thai, settled in the same area and make up the largest ethnic population of the region.

Architecture

The Mai Châu area is well known for its stilt houses. The type of stilt houses, or pile dwellings, they construct are called Thai stilt houses and are made of bamboo and timber. 

Environmental pressures
Mai Châu faces several environmental concerns:
 Deforestation - Land continues to be cleared to produce more crops.
 Trash - Mai Châu faces a garbage disposal problem and this is evident in the diminishing quality of their watercourses.
 Tourism - A gradual influx of tourists puts strain on the local environment.

Gallery

References

External links

Mai Châu mùa xuân

Districts of Hòa Bình province
Hòa Bình province